Eustace Payne (16 January 1887 – 12 November 1954) was a New Zealand cricketer. He played in one first-class match for Wellington in 1908/09.

See also
 List of Wellington representative cricketers

References

External links
 

1887 births
1954 deaths
New Zealand cricketers
Wellington cricketers
Cricketers from Melbourne